Antonietta "Toni" Boucher  is a United States politician in Connecticut. She was a Republican member of the Connecticut State Senate representing the 26th District and previously served in the Connecticut House of Representatives representing the 143rd District.

Biography 
Boucher was born in Italy and when she was five, she and her family immigrated to Naugatuck, Connecticut. She is a Roman Catholic.

Political career 
Toni Boucher served as a member of the Connecticut State Board of Education, where she was chair of the state’s policy and long-range planning committees.

Toni Boucher served on the Wilton Board of Selectmen and the town of Wilton’s Council on Public Facilities and Insurance Committees.  She was also active in the Connecticut Conference of Municipalities. In the past, she has served as an advisory board member of the New Canaan Nature Center and as a member of the Our Lady of Fatima Fundraising Steering Committee, Greystone Estates Association Board of Directors, Advisory Board of New Canaan Cares, Wilton League of Women Voters, Wilton Historical Society, board of directors of the Wilton Chapter of the AFS, and Friends of the Wilton Library.

From 1986 to 1994, she also served on the Wilton Board of Education, during which time she served as both the board’s chair and secretary. She also served on the board of directors of the Wilton Education Foundation and five school/community based planning teams; the Quality and Integrated Education Local Planning Committee and the Foreign Language Task Force (1978–92). She was active in the Connecticut Association of Boards of Education and the National Association of State Boards of Education; Wilton YMCA Expansion Fund; Board of the Wilton Youth Council's Project 94, 96 and 2000; Technology Task Force (1993–present); Gifted Task Force (1988–90); and the Wilton Parent-Teacher Associations.  Early in her career, she worked as a translator and secondary education language teacher.

From 1996 to 2008, Boucher served six terms in the Connecticut House of Representatives. She was first elected to the Connecticut House of Representatives in November 1996 from the 143rd District, which included the eastern portion of Norwalk and most of Wilton. The district also previously included New Canaan.

In the 2002 election, Boucher lost approximately 200 uncounted votes when a mechanical voting machine broke down.

In 2003, Boucher supported mass transit improvements. Boucher has continued to work on transportation-related issues, supporting the need to replenish the Highway Trust Fund.

Toni Boucher won against Democrat, Paul Burnham, in the 2004 election, taking 61% of the votes.

In the 2008 election, Toni Boucher won the senatorial 26th district seat following her six terms in Connecticut House of Representatives.

In 2010, Toni Boucher promoted a new law in Connecticut that would allow pet owners to leave a trust to their pets in order to care for the animals in case of their owner's death.

Toni Boucher is a critic of marijuana law reform. She served as a director for Human Services Council.

In 2013, Boucher addressed the United Nations regarding Senate resolutions on Tibet.

Toni Boucher won in the 2014 election over Democrat, Phil Sharlach.
  
Toni Boucher serves as a deputy minority leader of the State Senate. She is a ranking member of the state legislature's Education Committee and Higher Education Committee. She has been critical of the state's education record and recommended removing state education mandates and rewarding advanced students with scholarships. She has also been critical of Governor Malloy's vetoes of education-related bills, one of which would have required applicants for state commissioner of education to have education-related experience and higher-learning degrees.

She also serves as a member of the General Assembly’s Finance, Revenue & Bonding Committee, where she is ranking member of the subcommittee for Transportation Bonding.

On June 1, 2017 Senator Boucher announced that she was exploring a run for Governor. After exploring the possibility for more than 10 months, Boucher made the "not easy" decision to withdraw from the race. This was the second time she unsuccessfully "explored" running for governor only to withdraw; she made the same decision in 2014. Boucher claimed that her decision to run for re-election to the senate was motivated by the possibility that "We … could actually take over the state Senate in a big way." On November 6, 2018, however, she was defeated by the 22 year-old, first-time candidate, Will Haskell, one of several Democrats who helped solidify a majority control of both houses of the legislature.

Awards
2006: Art Advocate of the Year Award, Connecticut Art Teachers Association
2006: The Business Council of Fairfield County (SACIA) Community Leader Award
2007-2008: UNCONN Advocate Award
2008: Connecticut Arts Advocate Award, Ct Arts Educators Association
2008: Music Education Advocate Award, CMEA
2009: Environmental Champion, Connecticut League of Conservation Voters
2009: Woman of the Year, Fairfield County Homebuilders Association
2009, 2012, 2013 & 2014: Children’s Champion, Connecticut Early Childhood Alliance
2009-2010: General Assembly Voting & Attendance Record - 100%
2010: Ambassador Award, Council of Italian American Organizations (CIAO)
2010: Tip of the Hat Award, Connecticut Coalition for Achievement Now (ConnCAN)

References

1949 births
American University alumni
Connecticut city council members
Connecticut State Board of Education members
Republican Party Connecticut state senators
Living people
Republican Party members of the Connecticut House of Representatives
University of Connecticut alumni
University of South Dakota alumni
Women state legislators in Connecticut
Women city councillors in Connecticut
21st-century American politicians
21st-century American women politicians